This is a list of mayors of Nyon, Vaud, Switzerland. The mayor (syndic) of Nyon chairs the seven-member council (Municipalité). 

Nyon
Nyon